Ball lightning is a rare and unexplained phenomenon described as luminescent, spherical objects that vary from pea-sized to several meters in diameter. Though usually associated with thunderstorms, the observed phenomenon is reported to last considerably longer than the split-second flash of a lightning bolt, and is a phenomenon distinct from St. Elmo's fire.

Some 19th-century reports describe balls that eventually explode and leave behind an odor of sulfur. Descriptions of ball lightning appear in a variety of accounts over the centuries and have received attention from scientists. An optical spectrum of what appears to have been a ball lightning event was published in January 2014 and included a video at high frame rate. Laboratory experiments have produced effects that are visually similar to reports of ball lightning, but how these relate to the supposed phenomenon remains unclear.

Scientists have proposed a number of hypotheses to explain reports of ball lightning over the centuries, but scientific data on ball lightning remain scarce. The presumption of its existence has depended on reported public sightings, which have produced inconsistent findings. Owing to the lack of reproducible data, the existence of ball lightning as a distinct physical phenomenon remains unproven.

Historical accounts 
Ball lightning is a possible source of legends that describe luminous balls, such as the mythological Anchimayen from Argentinean and Chilean Mapuche culture.

According to statistical investigations in 1960, ball lightning had been seen by 5% of the population of the Earth. Another study analyzed reports of 10,000 cases.

Gervase of Canterbury 
The chronicle of Gervase of Canterbury, an English monk, contains what is possibly the earliest known reference to ball lightning, dated 7 June 1195. He states, "A marvellous sign descended near London", consisting of a dense and dark cloud, emitting a white substance that grew into a spherical shape under the cloud, from which a fiery globe fell towards the river.

Physicist Emeritus Professor Brian Tanner and historian Giles Gasper of Durham University identified the chronicle entry as probably describing ball lightning, and noted its similarity to other accounts: "Gervase's description of a white substance coming out of the dark cloud, falling as a spinning fiery sphere and then having some horizontal motion is very similar to historic and contemporary descriptions of ball lightning .... It is fascinating to see how closely Gervase's 12th century description matches modern reports of ball lightning."

Great Thunderstorm of Widecombe-in-the-Moor 

One early account reports on the Great Thunderstorm at a church in Widecombe-in-the-Moor, Devon, in England, on 21 October 1638. Four people died and approximately 60 suffered injuries during a severe storm. Witnesses described an  ball of fire striking and entering the church, nearly destroying it. Large stones from the church walls were hurled onto the ground and through large wooden beams. The ball of fire allegedly smashed the pews and many windows, and filled the church with a foul sulphurous odour and dark, thick smoke.

The ball of fire reportedly divided into two segments, one exiting through a window by smashing it open, the other disappearing somewhere inside the church. Because of the fire and sulphur smell, contemporaries explained the ball of fire as "the devil" or as the "flames of hell". Later, some blamed the entire incident on two people who had been playing cards in the pews during the sermon, thereby incurring God's wrath.

The sloop Catherine and Mary 
In December 1726, a number of British newspapers printed an extract of a letter from John Howell of the sloop Catherine and Mary:

HMS Montague 
One particularly large example was reported "on the authority of Dr. Gregory" in 1749:

Admiral Chambers on board the Montague, 4 November 1749, was taking an observation just before noon...he observed a large ball of blue fire about  distant from them. They immediately lowered their topsails, but it came up so fast upon them, that, before they could raise the main tack, they observed the ball rise almost perpendicularly, and not above  from the main chains when it went off with an explosion, as great as if a hundred cannons had been discharged at the same time, leaving behind it a strong sulphurous smell. By this explosion the main top-mast was shattered into pieces and the main mast went down to the keel.

Five men were knocked down and one of them very bruised. Just before the explosion, the ball seemed to be the size of a large mill-stone.

Georg Richmann 
A 1753 report recounts lethal ball lightning when professor Georg Richmann of Saint Petersburg, Russia, constructed a kite-flying apparatus similar to Benjamin Franklin's proposal a year earlier. Richmann was attending a meeting of the Academy of Sciences when he heard thunder and ran home with his engraver to capture the event for posterity. While the experiment was under way, ball lightning appeared, travelled down the string, struck Richmann's forehead and killed him. The ball had left a red spot on Richmann's forehead, his shoes were blown open, and his clothing was singed. His engraver was knocked unconscious. The door-frame of the room was split and the door was torn from its hinges.

HMS Warren Hastings 
An English journal reported that during an 1809 storm, three "balls of fire" appeared and "attacked" the British ship HMS Warren Hastings. The crew watched one ball descend, killing a man on deck and setting the main mast on fire. A crewman went out to retrieve the fallen body and was struck by a second ball, which knocked him back and left him with mild burns. A third man was killed by contact with the third ball. Crew members reported a persistent, sickening sulphur smell afterward.

Ebenezer Cobham Brewer 
Ebenezer Cobham Brewer, in his 1864 US edition of A Guide to the Scientific Knowledge of Things Familiar, discusses "globular lightning". He describes it as slow-moving balls of fire or explosive gas that sometimes fall to the earth or run along the ground during a thunderstorm. He said that the balls sometimes split into smaller balls and may explode "like a cannon".

Wilfrid de Fonvielle 
In his book Thunder and Lightning, translated into English in 1875, French science-writer Wilfrid de Fonvielle wrote that there had been about 150 reports of globular lightning:

Globular lightning seems to be particularly attracted to metals; thus it will seek the railings of balconies, or else water or gas pipes etc, It has no peculiar tint of its own but will appear of any colour as the case may be ... at Coethen in the Duchy of Anhalt it appeared green. M. Colon, Vice-President of the Geological Society of Paris, saw a ball of lightning descend slowly from the sky along the bark of a poplar tree; as soon as it touched the earth it bounced up again, and disappeared without exploding. On 10th of September 1845 a ball of lightning entered the kitchen of a house in the village of Salagnac in the valley of Correze. This ball rolled across without doing any harm to two women and a young man who were here; but on getting into an adjoining stable it exploded and killed a pig which happened to be shut up there, and which, knowing nothing about the wonders of thunder and lightning, dared to smell it in the most rude and unbecoming manner.

The motion of such balls is far from being very rapid – they have even been observed occasionally to pause in their course, but they are not the less destructive for all that. A ball of lightning which entered the church of Stralsund, on exploding, projected a number of balls which exploded in their turn like shells.

Tsar Nicholas II 
Tsar Nicholas II, the last Emperor of Russia, reported witnessing what he called "a fiery ball" while in the company of his grandfather, Emperor Alexander II:

Once my parents were away, and I was at the all-night vigil with my grandfather in the small church in Alexandria. During the service there was a powerful thunderstorm, streaks of lightning flashed one after the other, and it seemed as if the peals of thunder would shake even the church and the whole world to its foundations. Suddenly it became quite dark, a blast of wind from the open door blew out the flame of the candles which were lit in front of the iconostasis, there was a long clap of thunder, louder than before, and I suddenly saw a fiery ball flying from the window straight towards the head of the Emperor. The ball (it was of lightning) whirled around the floor, then passed the chandelier and flew out through the door into the park. My heart froze, I glanced at my grandfather – his face was completely calm. He crossed himself just as calmly as he had when the fiery ball had flown near us, and I felt that it was unseemly and not courageous to be frightened as I was. I felt that one had only to look at what was happening and believe in the mercy of God, as he, my grandfather, did. After the ball had passed through the whole church, and suddenly gone out through the door, I again looked at my grandfather. A faint smile was on his face, and he nodded his head at me. My panic disappeared, and from that time I had no more fear of storms.

Aleister Crowley 
British occultist Aleister Crowley reported witnessing what he referred to as "globular electricity" during a thunderstorm on Lake Pasquaney in New Hampshire, United States, in 1916. He was sheltered in a small cottage when he, in his own words,

As I looked at it, it exploded with a sharp report quite impossible to confuse with the continuous turmoil of the lightning, thunder and hail, or that of the lashed water and smashed wood which was creating a pandemonium outside the cottage. I felt a very slight shock in the middle of my right hand, which was closer to the globe than any other part of my body.

R. C. Jennison
Jennison, of the Electronics Laboratory at the University of Kent, described his own observation of ball lightning in an article published in Nature in 1969:

I was seated near the front of the passenger cabin of an all-metal airliner (Eastern Airlines Flight EA 539) on a late night flight from New York to Washington. The aircraft encountered an electrical storm during which it was enveloped in a sudden bright and loud electrical discharge (0005 h EST, March 19, 1963).

Other accounts 

 Willy Ley discussed a sighting in Paris on 5 July 1852 "for which sworn statements were filed with the French Academy of Science". During a thunderstorm, a tailor living next to Church of the Val-de-Grâce saw a ball the size of a human head come out of the fireplace. It flew around the room, reentered the fireplace, and exploded in and destroyed the top of the chimney.
 On 30 April 1877 a ball of lightning entered the Golden Temple at Amritsar, India, and exited through a side door. Several people observed the ball, and the incident is inscribed on the front wall of Darshani Deodhi.
 On 22 November 1894 an unusually prolonged instance of natural ball lightning occurred in Golden, Colorado, which suggests it could be artificially induced from the atmosphere. The Golden Globe newspaper reported:

A beautiful yet strange phenomenon was seen in this city on last Monday night. The wind was high and the air seemed to be full of electricity. In front of, above and around the new Hall of Engineering of the School of Mines, balls of fire played tag for half an hour, to the wonder and amazement of all who saw the display. In this building is situated the dynamos and electrical apparatus of perhaps the finest electrical plant of its size in the state. There was probably a visiting delegation from the clouds, to the captives of the dynamos on last Monday night, and they certainly had a fine visit and a roystering game of romp.

 On 22 May 1901 in the Kazakh city of Ouralsk in the Russian Empire (now Oral, Kazakhstan), "a dazzlingly brilliant ball of fire" descended gradually from the sky during a thunderstorm, then entered into a house where 21 people had taken refuge, "wreaked havoc with the apartment, broke through the wall into a stove in the adjoining room, smashed the stove-pipe, and carried it off with such violence that it was dashed against the opposite wall, and went out through the broken window". The incident was reported in the Bulletin de la Société astronomique de France the following year.
 In July 1907 ball lightning hit the Cape Naturaliste Lighthouse in Western Australia. Lighthouse-keeper Patrick Baird was in the tower at the time and was knocked unconscious. His daughter Ethel recorded the event.
 Ley discussed another incident in Bischofswerda, Germany. On 29 April 1925 multiple witnesses saw a silent ball land near a mailman, move along a telephone wire to a school, knock back a teacher using a telephone, and bore perfectly round coin-sized holes through a glass pane.  of wire was melted, several telephone poles were damaged, an underground cable was broken, and several workmen were thrown to the ground but unhurt. 
 An early fictional reference to ball lightning appears in a children's book set in the 19th century by Laura Ingalls Wilder. The books are considered historical fiction, but the author always insisted they were descriptive of actual events in her life. In Wilder's description, three separate balls of lightning appear during a winter blizzard near a cast-iron stove in the family's kitchen. They are described as appearing near the stovepipe, then rolling across the floor, only to disappear as the mother (Caroline Ingalls) chases them with a willow-branch broom.
 Pilots in World War II (1939–1945) described an unusual phenomenon for which ball lightning has been suggested as an explanation. The pilots saw small balls of light moving in strange trajectories, which came to be referred to as foo fighters.
 Submariners in World War II gave the most frequent and consistent accounts of small ball lightning in the confined submarine atmosphere. There are repeated accounts of inadvertent production of floating explosive balls when the battery banks were switched in or out, especially if misswitched or when the highly inductive electrical motors were misconnected or disconnected. An attempt later to duplicate those balls with a surplus submarine battery resulted in several failures and an explosion.
The hole in the window was found days later, and it was thought it could have happened during the thunderstorm;  a lightning strike was witnessed by residents in the area, and was recorded by a lightning strike tracking system at the Division for Electricity and Lightning Research at Uppsala University.
 In 2005 an incident occurred in Guernsey, where an apparent lightning-strike on an aircraft led to multiple fireball sightings on the ground. 
 On 10 July 2011, during a powerful thunderstorm, a ball of light with a  tail went through a window to the control room of local emergency services in Liberec in the Czech Republic. The ball bounced from window to ceiling, then to the floor and back, where it rolled along it for two or three meters. It then dropped to the floor and disappeared. The staff present in the control room were frightened, smelled electricity and burned cables and thought something was burning. The computers froze (not crashed) and all communications equipment was knocked out for the night until restored by technicians. Aside from damages caused by disrupting equipment, only one computer monitor was destroyed.
 On 15 December 2014, Loganair Flight 6780 in the UK experienced ball lightning in the forward cabin just before lightning struck the aircraft nose, the plane fell several thousand feet and came within 1,100 feet of the North Sea before making an emergency landing at Aberdeen Airport.
 On June 24, 2022, in a massive thunderstorm front, a retired lady at Liebenberg, Lower Austria, saw blinding CG lightning to the northeast and within 1 min spotted a yellowish "burning object with licking flames" that followed a wavy trajectory along the local road about 15 m over ground and was lost from sight after 2 seconds. It occurred at the end of a local thunderstorm cell. The European Severe Storms Laboratory recorded this as ball lightning.

Characteristics 
Descriptions of ball lightning vary widely. It has been described as moving up and down, sideways or in unpredictable trajectories, hovering and moving with or against the wind; attracted to, unaffected by, or repelled from buildings, people, cars and other objects. Some accounts describe it as moving through solid masses of wood or metal without effect, while others describe it as destructive and melting or burning those substances. Ball lightning has been described as transparent, translucent, multicolored, evenly lit, radiating flames, filaments or sparks, with shapes that vary between spheres, ovals, tear-drops, rods, or disks.

Ball lightning is often erroneously identified as St. Elmo's fire. They are separate and distinct phenomena.

The balls have been reported to disperse in many different ways, such as suddenly vanishing, gradually dissipating, being absorbed into an object, "popping," exploding loudly, or even exploding with force, which is sometimes reported as damaging. Accounts also vary on their alleged danger to humans, from lethal to harmless.

A review of the available literature published in 1972 identified the properties of a "typical" ball lightning, whilst cautioning against over-reliance on eye-witness accounts:
 They frequently appear almost simultaneously with cloud-to-ground lightning discharge
 They are generally spherical or pear-shaped with fuzzy edges
 Their brightness corresponds to roughly that of a domestic lamp, so they can be seen clearly in daylight
 A wide range of colors has been observed, with red, orange, and yellow being the most common
 The lifetime of each event is from one second to over a minute with the brightness remaining fairly constant during that time
 They tend to move at a few meters per second, most often in a horizontal direction, but may also move vertically, remain stationary, or wander erratically
 Many are described as having rotational motion
 It is rare that observers report the sensation of heat, although in some cases the disappearance of the ball is accompanied by the liberation of heat
 Some display an affinity for metal objects and may move along conductors such as wires or metal fences
 Some appear within buildings passing through closed doors and windows
 Some have appeared within metal aircraft and have entered and left without causing damage
 The disappearance of a ball is generally rapid and may be either silent or explosive
 Odors resembling ozone, burning sulphur, or nitrogen oxides are often reported

Direct measurements of natural ball lightning 

In January 2014, scientists from Northwest Normal University in Lanzhou, China, published the results of recordings made in July 2012 of the optical spectrum of what was thought to be natural ball lightning made by chance during the study of ordinary cloud–ground lightning on the Tibetan Plateau. Additional video was recorded by a high-speed (3000 frames/sec) camera, which captured only the last 0.78 seconds of the event, due to its limited recording capacity. Both cameras were equipped with slitless spectrographs. The researchers detected emission lines of neutral atomic silicon, calcium, iron, nitrogen, and oxygen—in contrast with mainly ionized nitrogen emission lines in the spectrum of the parent lightning.

Oscillations in the light intensity and in the oxygen and nitrogen emission at a frequency of 100 hertz, possibly caused by the electromagnetic field of the 50 Hz high-voltage power transmission line in the vicinity, were observed. From the spectrum, the temperature of the ball lightning was assessed as being lower than the temperature of the parent lightning (<15,000 to 30,000 K). The observed data are consistent with vaporization of soil as well as with ball lightning's sensitivity to electric fields.

Laboratory experiments 
Scientists have long attempted to produce ball lightning in laboratory experiments. While some experiments have produced effects that are visually similar to reports of natural ball lightning, it has not yet been determined whether there is any relation.

Nikola Tesla reportedly could artificially produce  balls and conducted some demonstrations of his ability. Tesla was more interested in higher voltages and powers as well as remote transmission of power; the balls he made were just a curiosity.

The International Committee on Ball Lightning (ICBL) held regular symposia on the subject. A related group uses the generic name "Unconventional Plasmas". The last ICBL symposium was tentatively scheduled for July 2012 in San Marcos, Texas but was cancelled due to a lack of submitted abstracts.

Wave-guided microwaves 
Ohtsuki and Ofuruton described producing "plasma fireballs" by microwave interference within an air-filled cylindrical cavity fed by a rectangular waveguide using a 2.45 GHz, 5 kW (maximum power) microwave oscillator.

Water discharge experiments 

Some scientific groups, including the Max Planck Institute, have reportedly produced a ball lightning-type effect by discharging a high-voltage capacitor in a tank of water.

Home microwave oven experiments 
Many modern experiments involve using a microwave oven to produce small rising glowing balls, often referred to as plasma balls.
Generally, the experiments are conducted by placing a lit or recently extinguished match or other small object in a microwave oven. The burnt portion of the object flares up into a large ball of fire, while "plasma balls" float near the oven chamber ceiling. Some experiments describe covering the match with an inverted glass jar, which contains both the flame and the balls so that they don't damage the chamber walls. (A glass jar, however, eventually explodes rather than simply causing charred paint or melting metal, as happens to the inside of a microwave.) The Israeli team demonstrated the phenomenon with copper, salts, water and carbon.

Silicon experiments 
Experiments in 2007 involved shocking silicon wafers with electricity, which vaporizes the silicon and induces oxidation in the vapors. The visual effect can be described as small glowing, sparkling orbs that roll around a surface. Two Brazilian scientists, Antonio Pavão and Gerson Paiva of the Federal University of Pernambuco have reportedly consistently made small long-lasting balls using this method. These experiments stemmed from the theory that ball lightning is actually oxidized silicon vapors (see vaporized silicon hypothesis, below).

Proposed scientific explanations 
There is at present no widely accepted explanation for ball lightning. Several hypotheses have been advanced since the phenomenon was brought into the scientific realm by the English physician and electrical researcher William Snow Harris in 1843, and French Academy scientist François Arago in 1855.

Vaporized silicon hypothesis 
This hypothesis suggests that ball lightning consists of vaporized silicon burning through oxidation. Lightning striking Earth's soil could vaporize the silica contained within it, and somehow separate the oxygen from the silicon dioxide, turning it into pure silicon vapor. As it cools, the silicon could condense into a floating aerosol, bound by its charge, glowing due to the heat of silicon recombining with oxygen. An experimental investigation of this effect, published in 2007, reported producing "luminous balls with lifetime in the order of seconds" by evaporating pure silicon with an electric arc. Videos and spectrographs of this experiment have been made available. This hypothesis got significant supportive data in 2014, when the first ever recorded spectra of natural ball lightning were published. The theorized forms of silicon storage in soil include nanoparticles of Si, SiO, and SiC.
Matthew Francis has dubbed this the "dirt clod hypothesis", in which the spectrum of ball lightning shows that it shares chemistry with soil.

Electrically charged solid-core model 
In this model ball lightning is assumed to have a solid, positively charged core. According to this underlying assumption, the core is surrounded by a thin electron layer with a charge nearly equal in magnitude to that of the core. A vacuum exists between the core and the electron layer containing an intense electromagnetic (EM) field, which is reflected and guided by the electron layer. The microwave EM field applies a ponderomotive force (radiation pressure) to the electrons preventing them from falling into the core.

Microwave cavity hypothesis 
Pyotr Kapitsa proposed that ball lightning is a glow discharge driven by microwave radiation that is guided to the ball along lines of ionized air from lightning clouds where it is produced. The ball serves as a resonant microwave cavity, automatically adjusting its radius to the wavelength of the microwave radiation so that resonance is maintained.

The Handel Maser-Soliton theory of ball lightning hypothesizes that the energy source generating the ball lightning is a large (several cubic kilometers) atmospheric maser. The ball lightning appears as a plasma caviton at the antinodal plane of the microwave radiation from the maser.

In 2017, Researchers from Zhejiang University in Hangzhou, China, have proposed that the bright glow of lightning balls is created when microwaves become trapped inside a plasma bubble. At the tip of a lightning stroke reaching the ground, a relativistic electron bunch can be produced when in contact with microwave radiation.
 The latter ionizes the local air and the radiation pressure evacuates the resulting plasma, forming a spherical plasma bubble that stably traps the radiation. Microwaves trapped inside the ball continue to generate plasma for a moment to maintain the bright flashes described in observer accounts. The ball eventually fades as the radiation held within the bubble starts to decay and microwaves are discharged from the sphere. The lightning balls can dramatically explode as the structure destabilizes. The theory could explain many of the strange characteristics of ball lightning. For instance, microwaves are able to pass through glass, which helps to explain why balls could be formed indoors.

Soliton hypothesis 

Julio Rubinstein, David Finkelstein, and James R. Powell proposed that ball lightning is a detached St. Elmo's fire (1964–1970). St. Elmo's fire arises when a sharp conductor, such as a ship's mast, amplifies the atmospheric electric field to breakdown. For a globe the amplification factor is 3. A free ball of ionized air can amplify the ambient field this much by its own conductivity. When this maintains the ionization, the ball is then a soliton in the flow of atmospheric electricity.

Powell's kinetic theory calculation found that the ball size is set by the second Townsend coefficient (the mean free path of conduction electrons) near breakdown. Wandering glow discharges are found to occur within certain industrial microwave ovens and continue to glow for several seconds after power is shut off. Arcs drawn from high-power low-voltage microwave generators also are found to exhibit afterglow. Powell measured their spectra, and found that the after-glow comes mostly from metastable NO ions, which are long-lived at low temperatures. It occurred in air and in nitrous oxide, which possess such metastable ions, and not in atmospheres of argon, carbon dioxide, or helium, which do not.

The soliton model of a ball lightning was further developed. It was suggested that a ball lightning is based on spherically symmetric nonlinear oscillations of charged particles in plasma – the analogue of a spatial Langmuir soliton. These oscillations were described in both classical and quantum approaches. It was found that the most intense plasma oscillations occur in the central regions of a ball lightning. It is suggested that bound states of radially oscillating charged particles with oppositely oriented spins – the analogue of Cooper pairs – can appear inside a ball lightning. This phenomenon, in its turn, can lead to a superconducting phase in a ball lightning. The idea of the superconductivity in a ball lightning was considered earlier. The possibility of the existence of a ball lightning with a composite core was also discussed in this model.

Hydrodynamic vortex ring antisymmetry 
One theory that may account for the wide spectrum of observational evidence is the idea of combustion inside the low-velocity region of spherical vortex breakdown of a natural vortex (e.g., the 'Hill's spherical vortex').

Nanobattery hypothesis 
Oleg Meshcheryakov suggests that ball lightning is made of composite nano or submicrometer particles—each particle constituting a battery. A surface discharge shorts these batteries, causing a current that forms the ball. His model is described as an aerosol model that explains all the observable properties and processes of ball lightning.

Buoyant plasma hypothesis 
The declassified Project Condign report concludes that buoyant charged plasma formations similar to ball lightning are formed by novel physical, electrical, and magnetic phenomena, and that these charged plasmas are capable of being transported at enormous speeds under the influence and balance of electrical charges in the atmosphere. These plasmas appear to originate due to more than one set of weather and electrically charged conditions, the scientific rationale for which is incomplete or not fully understood. One suggestion is that meteoroids breaking up in the atmosphere and forming charged plasmas as opposed to burning completely or impacting as meteorites could explain some instances of the phenomena, in addition to other unknown atmospheric events. However, according to Mark Stenhoff and Adrian James, this explanation is considered insufficient to explain the ball lightning phenomenon, and would likely not withstand peer review.

Transcranial magnetic stimulation 
Cooray and Cooray (2008) stated that the features of hallucinations experienced by patients having epileptic seizures in the occipital lobe are similar to the observed features of ball lightning. The study also showed that the rapidly changing magnetic field of a close lightning flash is strong enough to excite the neurons in the brain. This strengthens the possibility of lightning-induced seizure in the occipital lobe of a person close to a lightning strike, establishing the connection between epileptic hallucination mimicking ball lightning and thunderstorms.

More recent research with transcranial magnetic stimulation has been shown to give the same hallucination results in the laboratory (termed magnetophosphenes), and these conditions have been shown to occur in nature near lightning strikes.
This hypothesis fails to explain observed physical damage caused by ball lightning or simultaneous observation by multiple witnesses. (At the very least, observations would differ substantially.)

Theoretical calculations from University of Innsbruck researchers suggest that the magnetic fields involved in certain types of lightning strikes could potentially induce visual hallucinations resembling ball lightning. Such fields, which are found within close distances to a point in which multiple lightning strikes have occurred over a few seconds, can directly cause the neurons in the visual cortex to fire, resulting in magnetophosphenes (magnetically induced visual hallucinations).

Rydberg matter concept 
Manykin et al. have suggested atmospheric Rydberg matter as an explanation of ball lightning phenomena. Rydberg matter is a condensed form of highly excited atoms in many aspects similar to electron-hole droplets in semiconductors. However, in contrast to electron-hole droplets, Rydberg matter has an extended life-time—as long as hours. This condensed excited state of matter is supported by experiments, mainly of a group led by Holmlid. It is similar to a liquid or solid state of matter with extremely low (gas-like) density. Lumps of atmospheric Rydberg matter can result from condensation of highly excited atoms that form by atmospheric electrical phenomena, mainly from linear lightning. Stimulated decay of Rydberg matter clouds can, however, take the form of an avalanche, and so appear as an explosion.

Vacuum hypothesis 
Nikola Tesla (1899 December) theorized that the balls consist of highly rarefied (but hot) gas.

Other hypotheses 
Several other hypotheses have been proposed to explain ball lightning:

 Spinning electric dipole hypothesis. A 1976 article by V. G. Endean postulated that ball lightning could be described as an electric field vector spinning in the microwave frequency region.
 Electrostatic Leyden jar models. Stanley Singer discussed (1971) this type of hypothesis and suggested that the electrical recombination time would be too short for the ball lightning lifetimes often reported.
 Smirnov proposed (1987) a fractal aerogel hypothesis.
 M. I. Zelikin proposed (2006) an explanation (with a rigorous mathematical foundation) based on the hypothesis of plasma superconductivity (see also).
 H. C. Wu proposed (2016) that ball lightning arises when a "relativistic electron bunch" forming at the tip of a lightning stroke excites "intense microwave radiation" under certain conditions. As the microwaves ionize the surrounding air, their associated pressure may then evacuate the resulting plasma to form a bubble that "stably traps the radiation".
 A. Meessen presented a theory at the 10th International Symposium on Ball Lightning (June 21–27, 2010, Kaliningrad, Russia) explaining all known properties of ball lightning in terms of collective oscillations of free electrons. The simplest case corresponds to radial oscillations in a spherical plasma membrane. These oscillations are sustained by parametric amplification, resulting from regular "inhalation" of charged particles that are present at lower densities in the ambient air. Ball lightning vanishes thus by silent extinction when the available density of charged particles is too low, while it disappears with a loud and sometimes very violent explosion when this density is too high. Electronic oscillations are also possible as stationary waves in a plasma ball or thick plasma membrane. This yields concentric luminous bubbles.

See also 

 Atmospheric ghost lights
 Brown Mountain Lights
 Earthquake light
 Hitodama
 Marfa lights
 Naga fireball
 Spontaneous human combustion
 Sprite (lightning)
 Will-o'-the-wisp

References

Further reading 
 
Boerner, Herbert (2019). Ball Lightning. Springer. ISBN 978-3-0302-0782-3
 
 
 Coleman, P. F. 2006, "A Unified Theory of Ball Lightning and Unexplained Atmospheric Lights", J. Sci. Expl., Vol. 20, No. 2, 215–238.

External links
 The Proof Is Out There: Unexplained Lightning Phenomenon Caught On Camera - History (via YouTube)

Anomalous weather
Lightning
Plasma physics
Unsolved problems in physics
Unexplained phenomena
Atmospheric ghost lights